Gregory Bayne (born 10 March 1972) is a South African rower. He competed in the men's coxless pair event at the 1996 Summer Olympics.

References

External links
 

1972 births
Living people
South African male rowers
Olympic rowers of South Africa
Rowers at the 1996 Summer Olympics
Rowers from Johannesburg